Dr Ghulam Hussain is a Pakistani medical practitioner and politician.
He got his bachelor of medicine degree in 1963 and worked as a general practitioner 1963–1972 and 1974–1977. He belongs to a Jatt family.

He was a close ally of Zulfiqar Ali Bhutto and the co-founder of the Pakistan Peoples Party, ex-General Secretary of the PPP, also one of the writers of Pakistan's first constitution in 1973.

He practised as a doctor in Mandi Bahauddin for some time and gained popularity for his charity work. He joined Zulfiqar Ali Bhutto and formed the Pakistan Peoples Party. He won election and became a Member of the National Assembly of Pakistan (MNA) and later a Minister.

He was arrested and exiled by Gen Zia-ul-Haq from Pakistan in the early 1980s.

Childhood to mid-life
Hussain was born in the village of Jammarghal, union council Nakka Khurd, Tehsil & District Jhelum. His father was Haji Muhammed Akbar jutt and his mother Hajjan Rasul Bibi; they were both farmers. His parents had three sons and two daughters. The names of the sons are Ghulam Hussain, Ghulam Mustafa and  Ghulam Ahmad. Ghulam Hussain has two sister, Ghulam Fatima and Late Fazil Bibi.

The boys attended school in the village of Chakri three miles away every day. Hussain graduated top of his middle school, Chakri Rajgaan Teh. Jhelum, in 1952, then matriculated from Muslim Model High School, Lahore. He finished his high school in 1954 and then joined Government College Lahore where he gained a B.Sc in biology in 1958. He graduated with an MBBS from King Edward Medical College Lahore in 1963.

Early career
He started medical practice at Mandi Bahauddin in 1963. Because this was the nearest town from his village. He used to visit his native area on every Friday and treated free of cost. He started to organize Kayssan Council of his native area in 1964.

References

|-

|-

|-

|-

|-

|-

|-

|-

|-

|-
|-

Pakistan People's Party politicians
Pakistani general practitioners
People from Mandi Bahauddin District
People from Jhelum
1936 births
Living people
Pakistani Sunni Muslims
King Edward Medical University alumni
Government College University, Lahore alumni
Politicians from Jhelum